Michael Thomas Baumann (born September 10, 1995) is an American professional baseball pitcher for the Baltimore Orioles of Major League Baseball (MLB). He made his MLB debut in 2021.

Amateur career
Baumann attended Mahtomedi High School in Mahtomedi, Minnesota, and played for the school's baseball and American football teams. The Minnesota Twins selected him in the 34th round of the 2014 MLB draft. He did not sign, instead enrolling at Jacksonville University to play college baseball for the Jacksonville Dolphins. In 2016, he played collegiate summer baseball with the Yarmouth–Dennis Red Sox of the Cape Cod Baseball League.

Professional career
The Baltimore Orioles selected Baumann in the third round of the 2017 MLB draft. In 2018, Baumann began the season with the Delmarva Shorebirds of the Single-A South Atlantic League. He received a promotion in May to the Frederick Keys of the High-A Carolina League. He combined to go 7–6 with a 2.98 ERA and 142 strikeouts over 124 innings in 2019. On November 20, 2020, Baumann was added to the 40-man roster.

On September 7, 2021, Baumann made his major league debut with the Orioles against the Kansas City Royals at Oriole Park at Camden Yards. In his debut he pitched 3.2 innings and allowed two hits and one walk. Baumann struck out one batter and retired 11 of the 14 batters he faced. He also earned his first Major League win.

On March 16, 2023, it was announced that Baumann would shift to a short-relief role rather than being a starter.

Personal life
His older brother, Nick, also played baseball and football at Mahtomedi.

References

External links

1995 births
Living people
Aberdeen IronBirds players
Baltimore Orioles players
Baseball players from Minnesota
Bowie Baysox players
Delmarva Shorebirds players
Frederick Keys players
Gulf Coast Orioles players
Jacksonville Dolphins baseball players
Major League Baseball pitchers
Norfolk Tides players
People from Mahtomedi, Minnesota
Yarmouth–Dennis Red Sox players